Jack Denning (17 April 1875 – 7 January 1949) was  a former Australian rules footballer who played with Collingwood in the Victorian Football League (VFL).	He later played with Brunswick in the Victorian Football Association (VFA).

Notes

External links 

Jack Denning's profile at Collingwood Forever

1875 births
1949 deaths
Australian rules footballers from Western Australia
Collingwood Football Club players
Brunswick Football Club players
Perth Football Club players
Australian rules footballers from Melbourne